COVIDtests.gov is a website through which American residents, as well as those receiving US diplomatic and military mail, can order free COVID-19 rapid antigen tests from the US government. It was announced that the site would open for orders on January 19, 2022, but instead opened a day early, on January 18.

Overview
The website was announced by President Joe Biden in December 2021, although it did not then have a name. On January 12, 2022, a Wednesday, the White House announced the site would be online by the following weekend.

A White House press release announcing the website on January 14, said that 500 million tests would be available when the site went live

The site initially launched with just landing pages in English and Spanish. The English one said:

Also on January 14, CBS News wrote: "Tests should ship within seven to 12 days of ordering, the White House says. It's likely take longer than that to reach homes, though." The New York Times said "people are unlikely to receive the free tests until the end of January at the earliest. In some parts of the country, that may be after the peak of the current surge of cases."

The site opened for orders a day ahead of schedule, on January 18. At this time, the landing page was updated and expanded. The following message appeared at the top of the English language version:

At that time, the site said "orders will usually ship in 7-12 days."

Use

COVIDtests.gov sends users to a special order form on the USPS website to order the tests. There, users fill out fields for contact information and shipping information.

COVIDtests.gov also provides information on how the tests work, when to use then, and what to do with the results.

Shortly after launch, CNN reported that most of their readers who had used COVIDtests.gov had no trouble ordering, but a minority ran into problems.

Alternate ordering options

The site also lists phone numbers for ordering tests. Normal telephone users can call 1-800-232-0233; users of telephone text devices can call 1-888-720-7489.

References

External links

 COVIDtests.gov, the official site, in English
 COVIDtests.gov/es, in Spanish
 COVIDtests.gov/zh, in Chinese
 COVID Home Tests - USPS, the test order form

COVID-19 pandemic in the United States
Government services web portals in the United States
Scientific and technical responses to the COVID-19 pandemic
United States Department of Health and Human Services